The Maria Cristina di Savoia Literary Prize was founded in 1963 by the Maria Cristina di Savoia Cultural Meetings organization to reward, every two years, the writers who, in the contemporary literature so widely impacted by a hopeless materialism, give proof – in the full freedom of their artistic expression – of being "sensitive to human and Christian values".

This Prize has moreover a special physiognomy in having a Feminine Central Jury consisting of highly professional persons, with Second Tier Juries selected in the Meeting held all over Italy, in large and small towns of all the Regions, from Calabria, Sicily, Sardinia, to Friuli, Piedmont and Lombardy.

The Prize is named after Queen Maria Cristina of Savoy, wife of Ferdinand of Bourbon who died, considered a saint, in 1836: it also organizes meetings with the participation of some seventy cultural and educational groups active in all parts of Italy.
Winner works and authors since 1965:
 
	1966 –  L'iguana (The Iguana): Anna Maria Ortese. Ex equo with "The Passed Away Glory)": Umberto Cavasso
	1968 – Dannata beatitudine (Damned Beatitude): Angelo Padellaro
	1970 – Gli entronauti (The Intronauts): Piero Scanziani
	1972 – Il diario di Gusen (The Gusen Diary) : Aldo Carpi
	1974 – La rivolta di Abele (Abel's Revolt) : Giulio Bedeschi
	1976 – Il figlio (The Son) : Gino Montesanto
	1978 – La signora Teresa (Mrs. Teresa) : Giovanni Mosca
	1980 – Faccia da prete (Priest's Face): Caludio Sorgi
	1982 – Le mura del cielo (The Walls of Heaven) : Ferruccio Ulivi
	1984 – Galileo mio padre (Galileo, My Father) : Luca Desiato
	1986 – Cercando l'imperatore (Looking for the Emperor): Roberto Pazzi
	1988 – Trenta denari (Thirty Coins) : Ferruccio Ulivi
	1990 – Il caso anima (The Soul Case) : Giorgio De Simone
	1992 – Konradin (Konradin) : Italo Alighiero Chiusano
	1994 – Le storie dell'ultimo giorno (Last Day's Stories) : Stefano Jacomuzzi
	1996 – Cominciò in Galilea (It Began in Galilee) : Stefano Jacomuzzi
	1998 – Se un Dio pietoso (About a Mercyful God) : Giovanni D'Alessandro
	2000 – Il miracolo (The Miracle): Vittorio Messori
	2002 – La dogana del duca (The Duke's Toll): Giuseppe Bianchetti
	2004 – L'Erede (The Heir) : Roberto Pazzi
	2006 – 7 km da Gerusalemme (Seven Kilometers from Jerusalem) : Pino Farinotti
	2008 – Ragionevoli Dubbi (Reasonable Doubts) : Gianrico Carofiglio

Maria Cristina of Savoy 
Maria Cristina of Savoia (Cagliari, 14 November 1812 – Naples, 31 January 1836), Princess of the Kingdom of Sardinia, was the youngest daughter of Vittorio Emanuele I of Savoy and Maria Teresa of Habsburg-Este. Raised at the Court of Turin, she is recognized as 'Venerable' by the Catholic Church. 
In 1832, she married Ferdinando II of the Two Sicilies, becoming the Queen of that Reign. Their wedding was celebrated on 21 November 1832 in the Nostra Signora dell'Acquasanta Sanctuary in Genoa. She died in childbirth on 21 January 1837.

External links 

Italian literary awards
Awards established in 1963
1963 establishments in Italy